Alastair Campbell Mackintosh (born 21 June 1968), incorrectly listed as Alistair MacIntosh by FISA, is a former New Zealand rower.

Early career
Alastair Mackintosh won the Maadi cup twice representing Wanganui Collegiate School in his U17 season and his U18 season. They won in 1985 and 1986.

Professional career
At the 1989 World Rowing Championships at Bled, Yugoslavia, he won a Bronze in the men's four with Ian Wright, Bill Coventry, and Campbell Clayton-Greene. He represented New Zealand at the 1996 Summer Olympics in Atlanta in the Coxless four, where he rowed with Ian Wright, Chris White, and Scott Brownlee.

Retirement
Alastair has coached multiple Secondary school crews in Auckland. In 2017, he coached the Auckland Grammar School U15 8, which came second at the National secondary school competition Maadi Cup. He also coached the Saint Kentigern College U16 8, who came 2nd at the North Island Secondary School Championships.

References

1968 births
Living people
New Zealand male rowers
World Rowing Championships medalists for New Zealand
Rowers at the 1996 Summer Olympics
Rowers from Whanganui
People educated at Whanganui Collegiate School
Olympic rowers of New Zealand